Systems pharmacology is the application of systems biology principles to the field of pharmacology. It seeks to understand how drugs affect the human body as a single complex biological system. 
Instead of considering the effect of a drug to be the result of one specific drug-protein interaction, systems pharmacology considers the effect of a drug to be the outcome of the network of interactions a drug may have. In 1992, an article on systems medicine and pharmacology was published in China. Networks of interaction may include chemical-protein, protein–protein, genetic, signalling and physiological (at cellular, tissue, organ and whole body levels).  Systems pharmacology uses bioinformatics and statistics techniques to integrate and interpret these networks.

Systems pharmacology can be applied to drug safety studies as a complement to pharmacoepidemiology.

See also

 Quantitative Systems Pharmacology
 Drug interaction

PhD programs
PharMetrX: Pharmacometrics & Computational Disease Modelling (annual call for applications, July - Sept 15th)

References

External links
 Quantitative Systems Pharmacology white paper
 Systems Pharmacology at Harvard
 What is (Quantitative) Systems Pharmacology? by John Russell

Pharmacology